Olivier Morel (born 3 August 1972) is a French former professional tennis player.

Morel was a wildcard pairing, with Guillaume Marx, in the 1997 French Open men's doubles main draw. The pair were beaten in the first round by seventh seeds Rick Leach and Jonathan Stark. 

In 2002 he made his ATP Tour main draw debut in doubles at the TD Waterhouse Cup on Long Island.

Morel, now a New York-based tennis coach, has previously served as a tour coach of players including Mischa Zverev and Sergei Bubka. He is a former hitting partner of Ana Ivanovic.

ATP Challenger/ITF Futures finals

Doubles: 5 (2–3)

References

External links
  (has a duplicate profile as "Olivier Moral")
 

1972 births
Living people
French male tennis players
French tennis coaches